Jim Alcivar is an American keyboard and synthesizer player and sound engineer. He is most noted for his connection to guitarist Ronnie Montrose and appearing in his bands Montrose and Gamma and on his first solo album Open Fire. His father is composer, arranger and producer Bob Alcivar.

Discography – Musician
 Montrose – Warner Brothers Presents... Montrose! (1975)
 Montrose – Jump on It  (1976)
 Ronnie Montrose – Open Fire (1978)
 1994: – Please Stand By (1979)
 Gamma – Gamma 1 (1979)
 Gamma – Gamma 2 (1980)

Discography – Engineer 
 Dead Kennedys – Give Me Convenience or Give Me Death (1987)
 Dead Kennedys – Live at the Deaf Club 1979 (2004)

References

External links 
 Ronnie Montrose Info Page

 https://www.discogs.com/artist/531539-Jim-Alcivar

20th-century American keyboardists
Living people
Year of birth missing (living people)
Place of birth missing (living people)
Gamma (band) members
Montrose (band) members